Shin Ji (born Lee Ji-Seon; 18 November 1981) is a South Korean singer, lyricist and actress. She attended Dongduk Women's University – Department of Popular Music. She made her debut in 1998 in the group, Koyote, and wrote lyrics for some of the group's songs including "I Love Rock & Roll". She is the only female and original member of the group.

Discography

Studio albums

Singles

Soundtrack appearances

Filmography

Television series

Television shows

Radio shows

Web shows

Awards and nominations

References

External links 
 Shin Ji in Yahoo Music Korea

1981 births
K-pop singers
Living people
Musicians from Incheon
South Korean women pop singers
South Korean songwriters
South Korean female idols
South Korean television actresses
21st-century South Korean singers
21st-century South Korean women singers

ja:シンジ